HeliCops – Einsatz über Berlin is a German television series.

External links
 

1998 German television series debuts
2001 German television series endings
1990s crime television series
1990s German police procedural television series
2000s German police procedural television series
Aviation television series
Crime thriller television series
Television shows set in Berlin
German crime television series
German-language television shows
Sat.1 original programming